George Meyer (born 1956) is an American producer and writer.

George Meyer may also refer to:

 George Meyer (footballer) (born 1879), who played for FC Barcelona
 George Meyer (baseball) (1909–1992), American baseball player
 George von Lengerke Meyer (1858–1918), U. S. Postmaster General and Secretary of the Navy
 George Meyer (soccer coach), American soccer coach
 George W. Meyer (1884–1959), American Tin Pan Alley songwriter

See also
 Georg Meyer (disambiguation)
 George Mayer (disambiguation)
 George Myers (disambiguation)
 George Meyers (1865–1943), American baseball player
 Meyer (surname)